"Remember the Urge" is a maxi-single by the Japanese rock band, The Gazette. It was released on August 31, 2011 in two editions; the "Optical Impression" edition, "Auditory Impression" edition. The first includes the songs "Remember the Urge" and "Clever Monkey"- it also includes a DVD containing the music video and making for the song "Remember the Urge". The second comes with a bonus track, "Chijou".

Track listing

Remember the Urge: Optical Impression
Disk one
 "Remember the Urge" - 4:04
 "Clever Monkey" - 2:58
Disc two (DVD)
 "Remember the Urge: Music Clip + Making" - 6:25

Remember the Urge: Auditory Impression
 "Remember the Urge" - 4:04
 "Clever Monkey" - 2:58
 "Chijou" - 3:24

Note
 The single reached a peak mark of #6 on the Japanese Oricon Weekly Charts.

References

2011 singles
The Gazette (band) songs
2011 songs
Sony Music singles